was a Japanese sprinter. She competed in the women's 100 metres at the 1936 Summer Olympics. She later became a middle school gym teacher in Omuta, Fukuoka.

References

External links
 

1919 births
2014 deaths
Athletes (track and field) at the 1936 Summer Olympics
Japanese female sprinters
Olympic athletes of Japan
Sportspeople from Fukuoka Prefecture
Japan Championships in Athletics winners
Olympic female sprinters
20th-century Japanese women